The District of Columbia (a political division coterminous with Washington, D.C.)The district has had a system of direct voting since 1979, shortly after it gained home rule in 1973. Residents have the ability to place new legislation, or legislation recently passed by the city council, on the ballot for a popular vote. The district has three types of ballot measures that can be voted on in a general election: District Charter amendments, initiatives and referendums. In order to be placed on the ballot, supporters of a measure must gather signatures from registered voters.

Since adopting this process, ballot measures have become a common part of the city's electoral system.  more than 150 different initiatives had been filed with the district, along with a significantly smaller number of referendums; of those, only 29 have met the required qualifications to be placed on the ballot. Ballot measures have been used to legalize politically contentious policies such as local term limits, abolition of the tipped minimum wage, cannabis use, and advancements in the District of Columbia statehood movement.

Background
Since the late 1800s, the residents of the District of Columbia, have campaigned for control over their own affairs. In a substantial leap forward, the United States Congress passed the District of Columbia Home Rule Act in 1973, which devolved some of its powers to the city. Just a few years later in 1979, the newly formed city council passed the Initiative, Referendum, and Recall Procedures Act. This act created a process of direct democracy in which residents could enact their own laws or repeal existing laws.

The prominence of ballot measures has allowed Washington, D.C., to lead the nation in social issues. In 2014, residents approved Initiative 71, which legalized cannabis for recreational use, making the district the third U.S. jurisdiction behind Colorado and Washington state. The Entheogenic Plant and Fungus Policy Act of 2020 made the city the fourth U.S. jurisdiction to decriminalize entheogens. In 2022, voters approved Initiative 82, which eliminates the tipped minimum wage over five years, after an earlier initiative ultimately failed. It joined eight states in abolishing the practice.

Residents have also used ballot measures to expand their voting rights and (by extension) campaign for admitting the District of Columbia into the Union as the 51st state. An initiative in 1980 directed the D.C. government to begin the process of moving towards statehood due to the stalled and limited-in-scope voting rights amendment. Voters made the Attorney General for the District of Columbia an elected office beginning in 2014. An advisory referendum in 2016 showed that nearly 90 percent of residents support statehood, and it directed the D.C. Council to make formal statehood petitions to Congress.

Types of ballot measures

District Charter amendments 
District Charter amendments are changes to the District of Columbia Home Rule Charter, the law that established the D.C. government and its authority. They require a majority vote to pass the D.C. Council, a majority of voters to approve the amendment, and then are submitted to Congress for a 35-business day congressional review period. If Congress does not pass a resolution of disapproval, the amendment is adopted.

Initiatives
 Initiatives are measures placed on the ballot and, if passed, directly become law. They must meet specific requirements under the District Charter, including not authorizing discrimination or appropriating funds. In order to place an initiative or referendum on the ballot, supporters must file a proposal with the District of Columbia Board of Elections. Upon approval, there is a 10-day challenge period before supporters can begin gathering signatures. To be placed on the ballot, signatures equal to five percent of registered voters must be gathered.

Referendums
There are two types of referendums in the District of Columbia:

 Referendums are measures that seek to overturn or repeal laws recently-enacted by the D.C. government. Referendums are subject to the same requirements as initiatives.
 Advisory referendums are questions to gauge public opinion on a potential action of the D.C. Council.

Barriers to enactment
The D.C. government has concluded that approved ballot measures become self-enactingmeaning the government does not need to take action, such as an approving signature or proclamation, for the measure to take effect. However, many approved ballot measures have been invalidated by either the D.C. Council or Congress, much to the frustration of residents.

D.C. Council
The Initiative, Referendum, and Recall Procedures Act gives the D.C. Council the power to reverse voter-approved initiatives, as it did in 2001 regarding term limits and in 2019 regarding the tipped minimum wage.

Congressional intervention
Congress has ultimate authority over the district, including its budget. As a result, members of Congress, who do not represent the district and are not accountable to them, often add little-noticed clauses and amendments to the budget in order to manipulate or block the implementation of the city's laws. Two ballot measures were interfered with using this method:
 Initiative 59, which legalized cannabis for medical use, was blocked via the Barr Amendment, named after Congressman Bob Barr. It even prevented the D.C. government from counting the results of the ballot measure vote for over a year. The amendment remained in effect until Congress voluntarily overturned it in 2009.
 Initiative 71, which legalized cannabis for recreational use, was manipulated with a rider written by Congressman Andy Harris. It blocks the D.C. government from regulating the sale of cannabis, creating an unregulated gift economy. The rider remains in effect 

Initiative 77 was threatened by an amendment written by Congressmen Mark Meadows and Gary Palmer to block it from taking effect. The amendment did not appear in the final enacted budget bill; it was instead repealed by the D.C. Council.

List of ballot measures since 1979

Notes

References

External links
 D.C. Board of Elections: Initiative Measures and Referenda

Elections in Washington, D.C.
Washington, D.C.-related lists
Lists of referendums